Valentia may refer to:

Places
Valentia Island, off the coast of County Kerry, Ireland
Valentia (Roman Britain), a province of Roman Britain
Valence, Drôme, France, known in Roman times as Valentia
Nuragus, Sardinia, Italy, known in Roman times as Valentia
Valencia, Spain, known in Roman times as Valentia

Other uses
 Vickers Valentia, a 1920s British flying boat
 Vickers Type 264 Valentia, a British biplane cargo aircraft of the 1930s and '40s
 Valentia (Hagerstown, Maryland), a building on the U.S. National Register of Historic Places
 a synonym for Scotlandia (conodont) (as †Valentia morrochensis Smith 1907), an extinct genus of conodonts in the family Prioniodinidae
 Viscount Valentia, a title in the Peerage of Ireland
 Valentia, a 2013 album by Calibre (musician)

See also
Valencia (disambiguation)